Castle Street may refer to:

 Castle Street, Bridgwater, England
 Castle Street, Cambridge, England
 Castle Street, Dunedin, New Zealand
 Castle Street, Oxford, England

See also 
 62 Castle St, a hotel in Liverpool, England
 Castle St, a 2022 album by New Zealand band Six60
 Castle Street Row, a historic building in Worcester, Massachusetts, US
 The Madhouse on Castle Street, a British television play
 Castle Square (disambiguation)

Road disambiguation pages
Odonyms referring to a building